Miguel Aires Fernandes de Oliveira (born 25 May 1994) is a Portuguese professional footballer who plays for Cypriot club AEL Limassol as a goalkeeper.

Club career

Vitória Guimarães
Born in the village of Infantas in Guimarães, Oliveira joined Vitória SC's youth system at the age of 9. On 18 August 2012 he made his professional debut in the Segunda Liga with the reserves, coming on as a substitute after Assis was sent off late into the first half of an eventual 1–0 away loss against Sporting CP B.

For the 2017–18 season, Oliveira was promoted to the first team in the Primeira Liga as third choice, behind Brazilian Douglas and fellow youth graduate Miguel Silva. On 31 January 2020, he was loaned to second division club Leixões S.C. until 30 June.

Moreirense
Oliveira returned to the top tier in September 2020, signing a two-year contract with Moreirense F.C. on a free transfer. He only made his top-tier debut on 14 May 2021, in a 2–1 defeat at S.C. Braga.

For the rest of his spell at the Parque de Jogos Comendador Joaquim de Almeida Freitas, Oliveira continued to be second or third choice.

AEL Limassol
In August 2022, Oliveira joined AEL Limassol of the Cypriot First Division on a two-year deal.

References

External links

1994 births
Living people
Sportspeople from Guimarães
Portuguese footballers
Association football goalkeepers
Primeira Liga players
Liga Portugal 2 players
Campeonato de Portugal (league) players
Vitória S.C. B players
Vitória S.C. players
Leixões S.C. players
Moreirense F.C. players
Cypriot First Division players
AEL Limassol players
Portugal youth international footballers
Portuguese expatriate footballers
Expatriate footballers in Cyprus
Portuguese expatriate sportspeople in Cyprus